Tajiv Singh Masson (born 27 February 1985), known as Tosh Masson, is a rugby union player who played for Harlequins in the Guinness Premiership, playing primarily as a centre.

He is the only Sikh to have played professional rugby.

References

External links
Harlequins profile
Beccehamians past players

1985 births
Living people
English rugby union players
British people of Indian descent
Harlequin F.C. players
People educated at Whitgift School
Rugby union players from Greater London
Rugby union centres